Swamikartik Khapar is a rural municipality in Bajura District in the Sudurpashchim Province of Nepal. It was formed in March 2017, in line with the Constitution of Nepal 2015. It is the second biggest rural municipality in terms of population and smallest on the basis of area. It is divided into 5 wards and the headquarter  of this newly formed municipality is situated at Wai. It is formed by merging previous VDCs named Sappata, Wai and Jukot.

Demographics
At the time of the 2011 Nepal census, Swamikartik Khapar Rural Municipality had a population of 12,790. Of these, 100.0% spoke Nepali as their first language.

In terms of ethnicity/caste, 42.5% were Chhetri, 21.2% Kami, 15.2% Thakuri, 12.9% Hill Brahmin, 2.9% Damai/Dholi, 2.8% Sanyasi/Dasnami, 1.1% Lohar, 0.9% Sarki, 0.3% Kumal and 0.1% others.

In terms of religion, 100.0% were Hindu.

References

Bajura District
Rural municipalities of Nepal established in 2017
Rural municipalities in Bajura District